The Richmond WCT, also known by its sponsored names Fidelity Bankers Invitational and United Virginia Bank Tennis Classic, was a men's tennis tournament played in Richmond, Virginia in the United States from 1966 through 1984. The first six editions, from 1966 through 1971, were invitational tournaments and were held at the Richmond Arena. In 1972 the event became part of the World Championship Tennis (WCT) Tour and moved to the Richmond Coliseum. All editions were held on indoor carpet courts.

Finals

Singles

Doubles

See also
 Virginia Slims of Richmond – women's tournament

Notes

References

External links
 ATP Tour archive
 Reports and photos of 1977 Richmond WCT Mike Harris, Ben Blake, Tom Savage Commonwealth Times 1977-02-08, pages 12–15
 The $35,000 Racquet Dave Cody, Commonwealth Times February 17, 1981 pp. 1,12–13,24

World Championship Tennis
Defunct tennis tournaments in the United States
Sports in Richmond, Virginia
Recurring sporting events established in 1966
Recurring sporting events disestablished in 1984
Tennis in Virginia
1966 establishments in Virginia
1984 disestablishments in Virginia